Gustavo Fuentes (born 8 April 1973 in Buenos Aires) is a former Argentine footballer who plays as a striker.

Club career
Fuentes has played for some fifteen clubs during his career, which has taken him through several continents.

See also
 Dundee United FC Season 2000-01

External links

 BDFA profile
 Argentine Primera statistics

1973 births
Footballers from Buenos Aires
Living people
Argentine footballers
Talleres de Córdoba footballers
Club Atlético River Plate (Montevideo) players
C.A. Cerro players
Argentine expatriate sportspeople in Israel
Liverpool F.C. (Montevideo) players
Platense F.C. players
C.D. Marathón players
F.C. Motagua players
Dundee United F.C. players
C.D. Olimpia players
Bnei Yehuda Tel Aviv F.C. players
Alianza F.C. footballers
Scottish Premier League players
Expatriate footballers in Israel
Argentine expatriate footballers
Expatriate footballers in Chile
Expatriate footballers in Honduras
Expatriate footballers in Scotland
Expatriate footballers in Uruguay
Expatriate footballers in El Salvador
Liga Nacional de Fútbol Profesional de Honduras players
Argentine expatriate sportspeople in Scotland
Israeli Premier League players
Association football forwards
Argentine expatriate sportspeople in Chile
Argentine expatriate sportspeople in Honduras
Argentine expatriate sportspeople in Uruguay
Argentine expatriate sportspeople in El Salvador
Argentine expatriate sportspeople in England